Renato Sulić (born 12 November 1979 in Rijeka) is a Croatian handball player who currently plays for RK Zamet.

Club career
Sulić started his youth career in RK Trsat where very quickly he showed a great capability in playing handball. Soon he moved to RK Zamet where he helped the team return to the First A League in 1995-96 season. The same year he was also a part of the winning Zamet team in the U-19 Championship.

After four years in Zamet he became unhappy with his status in the club and left to Metković Jambo. He stayed in the club for only a year and won his first European competition EHF Cup and finishing second in the league.

Sulić returned for a season to RK Zamet before going to play for RK Zagreb. During his time in Zagreb he won 3 league titles and 2 cup titles. After Zagreb he had short stints in Fotex Veszprém, Agram Medvečak before spending three years in Pivovarna Laško Celje.

In 2009 Sulić returned to Veszprém where he has won every domestic cup and league season since 2009 and SEHA League since 2014.

International career

Renato made his first appearance for Croatia at the 2001 World Championship. The same year he won his first medal at the 2001 Mediterranean Games where Croatia won first place.

In 2003 Renato played a pivotal role in Croatia winning the 2003 World Championship.

After the 2004 European Championship where Croatia secured 4th place Sulić got hit in a car accident. He had an operation on his left knee and missed out on the 2004 Summer Olympics.

In 2006 he played at the World Cup in Sweden where Croatia won first place. In 2008 he won a silver medal with Croatia at 2008 European Championship in Norway. 
The same year he represented his country at the 2008 Summer Olympics in Beijing, China. Croatia lost in the semi-finals and finished at fourth place.

After not being selected for 7 years Željko Babić called up Sulić to play for the national team but Sulić refused and said his national team days are a finished story.

Personal life
Sulić has been married to former Miss Universe contestant Maja Cecić-Vidoš since 2003. Renato and Maja have four children, three daughters and a son.

For a while Sulić and his wife owned a local bar in Rijeka named Maat Bar. Renato and Maja have four children, three daughters and a son.

In 2016 Sulić obtained Hungarian citizenship.

Honours

Club
Zamet
Croatian First B League (1): 1995-96
Croatian Championship U-19 (1): 1996

Zagreb
Croatian First League (3): 2001-02, 2002–03, 2003–04
Croatian Cup (2): 2003, 2004

Pivovarna Laško Celje
Slovenian First League (2): 2006-07, 2007–08
Slovenian Cup (1): 2007

Veszprém
Hungarian First League (9): 2004-05, 2009–10, 2010–11, 2011–12, 2012–13, 2013–14, 2014–15, 2015-16, 2016-17
Hungarian Cup (10): 2005, 2010, 2011, 2012, 2013, 2014, 2015, 2016, 2017, 2018
SEHA League (2): 2014-15, 2015–16
EHF Champions League final (2): 2014-15, 2015–16

Croatia
2001 Mediterranean Games in Tunis - 1st
2002 European Championship in Sweden - 16th
2003 World Championship in Portugal - 1st
2004 European Championship in Slovenia - 4th
2006 European Championship in Switzerland - 4th
2006 World Cup in Sweden - 1st
2007 World Championship in Germany - 5th
2008 European Championship in Norway - 2nd
2008 Summer Olympics in Beijing - 4th

Individual
2003 Athletes of the Year by Croatian Olympic Committee
2006 Athletes of the Year by Croatian Olympic Committee
2013-14 EHF Champions League top 8
2013-14 EHF Champions League best line player
2014-15 EHF Champions League all-star team
RK Zamet hall of fame - 2015

References

External links
 Renato Sulić player profile on MKB Veszprém KC official website

1979 births
Living people
Handball players from Rijeka
Croatian male handball players
Olympic handball players of Croatia
Handball players at the 2008 Summer Olympics
RK Zamet players
Wisła Płock (handball) players
Mediterranean Games gold medalists for Croatia
Competitors at the 2001 Mediterranean Games
Croatian expatriate sportspeople in Slovenia
Croatian expatriate sportspeople in Hungary
Croatian expatriate sportspeople in Poland
Mediterranean Games medalists in handball